Tomáš Linhart (born 16 February 1984) is a Czech professional ice hockey defenceman. Linhart played with HC Zlín in the Czech Extraliga 2006-2009, and during the 2010–11 Czech Extraliga season. He was selected by the Montreal Canadiens in the 2nd round (45th overall) of the 2002 NHL Entry Draft but did not play.

Career statistics

Regular season and playoffs

International

References

External links

1984 births
Czech ice hockey defencemen
PSG Berani Zlín players
Living people
Sportspeople from Pardubice
Montreal Canadiens draft picks
Czech expatriate ice hockey players in Canada
HC Vrchlabí players
Stadion Hradec Králové players
HC Dynamo Pardubice players
Hokej Šumperk 2003 players
HC Oceláři Třinec players